Mahran Abu Raiya (born 22 January 1983, is an Arab-Israeli professional association football player who plays for Ironi Tiberias. At international level, Abu Raiya was capped at under-21 level.

References

1983 births
Living people
Arab citizens of Israel
Arab-Israeli footballers
Israeli footballers
Israel under-21 international footballers
Bnei Sakhnin F.C. players
Hapoel Petah Tikva F.C. players
Hapoel Acre F.C. players
Hapoel Haifa F.C. players
Hapoel Iksal F.C. players
F.C. Tzeirei Kafr Kanna players
Ironi Tiberias F.C. players
Association football defenders
Liga Leumit players
Israeli Premier League players
Footballers from Sakhnin
People from Sakhnin